Towson Run is a tributary of Jones Falls, a stream in Baltimore County, Maryland, in the United States. The stream runs north through Sheppard Pratt and Towson University, near the communities of Rodgers Forge and Armagh Village.

Geology

The type locality of the Baltimore Gneiss outcrops along Towson Run from Bellona Avenue to Towsontown Boulevard.

References

Rivers of Maryland
Rivers of Baltimore County, Maryland